An Occasional Oratorio (HWV 62) is an oratorio by George Frideric Handel, based upon a libretto by Newburgh Hamilton after the poetry of John Milton and Edmund Spenser. The work was written in the midst of the Jacobite rising of 1745–1746, the attempt to overthrow Handel's patrons the Hanoverian monarchy under George II and replace them with a Stuart restoration under Charles Edward Stuart, "Bonnie Prince Charlie". The Occasional Oratorio is unique among Handel's works which he labelled "oratorio" in that it does not tell a story or contain elements of a drama, but was intended as a defiant and patriotic rallying piece. The Stuart armies, based in Scotland, had invaded England and got as far as Derby when the King's armies under the command of the King's son Prince William, Duke of Cumberland had driven them back to Scotland in December 1745. The fighting was at a hiatus due to winter weather and the Duke of Cumberland was in London in February 1746. Handel composed the Occasional Oratorio hastily in January and February 1746, "borrowing" and re-arranging some movements from previous compositions, and premiered it immediately on 14 February 1746 with Willem de Fesch, Élisabeth Duparc, Elisabetta de Gambarini, John Beard (tenor), and Thomas Reinhold at Covent Garden Theatre.  It contains 44 movements split over three parts. Part One, generally speaking, concerns the miseries of war and the vengeance of a wrathful God, Part Two the blessings of peace, and Part Three a thanksgiving for victory. This was felt at the time by some to be premature as the rebels had not yet been defeated, Charles Jennens, Handel's friend and collaborator who wrote the text for Saul and others of Handel's oratorios called the piece "a triumph for a victory not yet gained." The festive four part overture, with trumpets and drums, is sometimes performed outside the context of the entire piece.  The famous chorus "Prepare the Hymn" (a paraphrase of Psalm 81:1-2) is the 26th movement and appears in the second part.  The second minuet from the Music for the Royal Fireworks was reused from this oratorio. Handel's coronation anthem Zadok the Priest was also reused as the finale to the oratorio, but excluded the second movement "And all the people rejoic'd".

Recordings
With Susan Gritton soprano, Lisa Milne soprano, James Bowman countertenor, John Mark Ainsley tenor, Michael George (bass), The King's Consort, Choir of The King's Consort, New College Choir, Oxford, Robert King conductor. Hyperion CD:CDAyomom66961/2 Year of release: 2010
With Julia Doyle soprano, Ben Johnson tenor, Peter Harvey (baritone),Chor des Bayerischen Rundfunks and the Akademie für Alte Musik Berlin, Howard Arman, conductor. BR Klassik CD:900520 Year of release: 2017

List of musical numbers

Overture
1.1. Arioso: Why do the gentiles tumult?
1.2. Chorus: Let us break off by strength of hand
1.3. Aria: O Lord, how many are my foes!
1.4. Chorus: Him or his God we not fear!
1.5. Aria: Jehovah, to my words give ear
1.6. Chorus: Him or his God we scorn to fear!
1.7. Recitative: The Highest who in Heaven doth dwell
1.8. Aria: O, who shall pour into my swollen eyes
1.9. Aria: Fly from the threat'ning vengeance, fly!
1.10. Accompagnato: Humbled with fear
1.11. Aria: His sceptre is the rod of righteousness
1.12. Aria: Be wise, be wise at length
1.13. Chorus: Be wise, be wise at length
1.14. Recitative: Of many millions the populous rout
1.15. Aria: Jehovah is my shield, my glory
1.16. Recitative: Fools or madmen stand not within
1.17. Chorus: God found them guilty

PART II

2.1. Aria: O liberty, thou choicest treasure
2.2. Recitative: Who trusts in God should ne'er despair
2.3. Aria: Prophetic visions strike my eye
2.4. Chorus mit Solo (alto): May God, from whom all mercies
2.5. Recitative: The Lord hath heard my pray'r
2.6. Aria: Then will I Jehovah's praise
2.7. Chorus: All his mercies shall endure
2.8. Aria: How great and many perils do enfold
2.9. Duett (soprano, alto): After long storms and tempests overblown
2.10. Aria, Chorus: To God, our strength, sing loud
2.11. Aria: He has his mansion fix'd on high
2.12. Chorus: Hallelujah, your voices raise

PART III

3.1. Sinfonia
3.2. Chorus: I will sing unto the Lord
3.3. Chorus: Who is like unto thee, O Lord?
3.4. Aria: When warlike ensigns wave on high
3.5. Recitative: The enemy said, I will pursue
3.6. Aria: The enemy said, I will pursue
3.7. Aria: The sword that's drawn in virtue's cause
3.8. Chorus: Millions unborn shall bless the hand
3.9. Recitative: When Israel, like the bounteous Nile
3.10. Aria: When Israel, like the bounteous Nile
3.11. Aria: Tyrants, whom no cov'nants bind
3.12. Accompagnato: May balmy peace, and wreath'd renown
3.13. Aria: May balmy peace, and wreath'd renown
3.14. Chorus: Blessed are all they that fear the Lord

References

External links
 
 An Occasional Oratorio at gfhandel.org.
 Full-text libretto hosted by Stanford University.

Oratorios by George Frideric Handel
1746 compositions